Madame Justice Barbara M. Young is a judge on the Supreme Court of British Columbia.

Barbara Young studied law at the University of Calgary, graduating with an LL.B. in 1985. She was admitted to the Bar of British Columbia in 1986, practiced primarily in family law, personal injury and bankruptcy in Vancouver and was appointed the Queen's Counsel in 2005. She was appointed to the Supreme Court of British Columbia on June 19, 2015.

Barbara M. Young became a certified family mediator in 1996 and was admitted to the child protection mediation roster in 2003. She was appointed Queen’s counsel (QC) in January 2006.

References

Judges in British Columbia
Living people
Canadian women judges
Year of birth missing (living people)
University of Calgary Faculty of Law alumni